Operation Desert Thunder was a response to threats by Iraq's president Saddam Hussein to shoot down U-2 spy planes, and violate the no-fly zone set up over his country. The operation was designed to bring stability to the region by bringing in a military presence during the negotiations between Iraq and the UN over weapons of mass destruction. The name Operation Desert Thunder has been applied to the build-up of forces in the Persian Gulf region during 1998.

If an actual attack had been ordered and executed, the name would have changed to Operation Desert Viper.

In the autumn of 1997 CENTCOM established a force of 35,000 air, land, and sea forces in response to Iraq's non-compliance of UN resolutions. CENTCOM Commander-in-Chief General Anthony Zinni established a permanent Coalition/Joint Task Force (C/JTF) at Camp Doha in Kuwait under command of Lieutenant General Tommy Franks to lead this force. The coalition would consist of forces from Argentina, Australia, Canada, Czech Republic, Hungary, New Zealand, Poland, Romania, United Kingdom, United States, and Kuwait.

On 18 January 1998 additional forces were brought in to support the U.S.-led coalition forces in the region. The U.S. 3d Infantry Division of Fort Stewart, Georgia, deployed 4,000 personnel and 2,900 short tons of equipment on 120 aircraft. Elements of 32nd Air and Missile Defense Command and 2nd Battalion 504th Parachute Infantry Regiment (82nd Airborne Division, Fort Bragg, NC) deployed to Saudi Arabia, Kuwait and Bahrain. The 366th Air Expeditionary Wing from Mountain Home Air Force Base, ID replaced the 347th Air Expeditionary Wing of Moody AFB, Georgia on 1 April 1998 after 120 days of deployment. USS George Washington (CVN-73) joined USS Nimitz (CVN-68) (relieved on-station by USS Independence (CV-62) a few months later) in the Gulf. Combined with the British HMS Invincible (R05) and HMS Illustrious (R06), there were now 50 ships and submarines with 200 naval aircraft, a floating brigade (Army) and the 11th Marine Expeditionary Unit in the Persian Gulf.

This combined muscle forced Saddam to back down, and the Independence returned to Yokosuka, Japan in early June 1998. In July 1998 the 3-101st Attk Avn Bn deployed two AH-64A Companies to Ali Al Salem AB to maintain a strong presence in the region.  Then in November 1998, the U.S. 3d Infantry Division returned to Kuwait. Using the C/JTF already in place advanced elements of the U.S. 3d Infantry Division and 32nd Air & Missile Defense Command, Theatre Support Command, and Air Support Operations Center deployed. In addition the 2nd Marine Expeditionary Force joined the 1st Marine Expeditionary Force already in place. During this build-up, UN Secretary-General Kofi Annan flew to Baghdad to meet with Saddam Hussein and negotiated to allow uninterrupted inspections.

On 11 November 1998, further non-compliance by Iraq resulted in the initiation of Operation Desert Thunder. CENTCOM moved its forces into position to initiate strikes into Iraq; 2,300 additional personnel were deployed during this operation. On the evening of 15 November, USS Dwight D. Eisenhower (CVN-69) was just minutes away from launching air strikes on targets in Iraq when Saddam Hussein again backed down.

In December 1998, Iraq again refused to allow inspections and Operation Desert Fox began. Several key Iraqi facilities and specialized equipment were destroyed during several days of air strikes including from the flight deck of USS Enterprise (CVN-65). This set back the Iraqi ballistic missile program by several years.

See also
 Dual containment
 Operation Desert Scorpion (Iraq 1998)

Notes

References
 globalsecurity.org Desert Thunder

Iraq–United States relations
Conflicts in 1998
Non-combat military operations involving the United States
20th-century military history of the United States
Cancelled military operations involving the United States
Cancelled military operations involving France
Cancelled military operations involving the United Kingdom
United States Marine Corps in the 20th century